Paws. is the only studio album by the British indie band Pull Tiger Tail. The album was completed in February 2007 but management difficulties and trouble with B-Unique, the band's record label at the time, meant that it remained legally in the hands of the label even after the band was no longer signed to them. In 2009, the album was in the hands of the band and was physically released on 14 September 2009 on CD and vinyl formats, with the latter being a limited edition of 250. A digital download of the album was made available from 17 August 2009.

Track listing

Tracks 2, 4, 5, 6 and 7 have all been previously released as singles or B-sides, although the versions of "Animator" and "Even Good Kids Make Bad Sports" on the album are different to those previously released.

References

External links
Official Pull Tiger Tail website

2009 debut albums
Pull Tiger Tail albums